The following is a list of songs written about Ahmedabad, also known as "Amdavad" a city of Gujarat, India:

 "Awesome Amdavad" - a song composed by Mehul Surti
 "Aa Amdavad"
 "Amdavad Re" - song by Vishal Dadlani
 "Mijaj Amdavadi"
 "Hu Amdavad no Rickshaw Walo" - 1987 film song from Maa-Baap sung by Kishore Kumar
 "Eke Lal Darwaje" - a 1976 Gujarati song

References

Ahmedabad
Gujarati culture
Songs about India
Songs
Ahmedabad-related lists